Ida Reading a Letter is an 1899 painting by Vilhelm Hammershøi. It is an example of a work inspired by Dutch Golden Age painting and is currently in a private collection.

Early history and creation

In 1887 Hammershoi travelled to the Netherlands, where he saw works by Vermeer and his Delft contemporaries first-hand. This painting shows many characteristics of such room interiors, usually featuring a woman at an everyday task. This painting seems to have been directly inspired by a Vermeer he would have seen in Amsterdam, Woman in Blue Reading a Letter. The use of the hairstyle, pose, table and indirect light all recall this painting, and the reduction of household items to a bare minimum of objects is typical of 17th-century Dutch interiors. This painting was painted a year after Hammershoi moved into his apartment at Strandgade 30 in Copenhagen.

Description and interpretation
The work shows the artist's wife Ida reading a letter. She is standing near a table laid with a double coffee pot with one cup. The table, closed door behind her and the open door in front of her serve to anchor her position in the otherwise gray space. These and other architectural elements of this apartment were often painted by Hammershoi in this period.

Later history and influence
Hammershoi's work was well received at an exhibition in London in 2008, which revived international interest in his work.
This painting was purchased from the artist himself by Edmund Henriques and remained in the hands of his descendants until appearing on the art market in 1984. It was sold 11 June 2012 at Sotheby's London for the record-breaking price of £1.7 million.

References

Paintings by Vilhelm Hammershøi
1899 paintings